The following highways are numbered 522:

Afghanistan
Route 522 (Afghanistan)

Canada
Alberta Highway 522
 Ontario Highway 522

India
 National Highway 522 (India)

United States